Caloptilia mutilata is a moth of the family Gracillariidae. It is known from Turkey.

References

mutilata
Endemic fauna of Turkey
Moths described in 1880
Moths of Asia